Air Vice Marshal Thomas William "Bill" Rimmer,  (born 16 December 1948) is a former Royal Air Force officer who served as Commander of British Forces Cyprus.

RAF career
Educated at Morrison's Academy and at the University of Edinburgh, Rimmer joined the Royal air Force in 1971. He became Head of the RAF Presentation Team in 1989, Station Commander at RAF Cottesmore in 1990 and Senior UK Military Officer at the Western European Union in 1992. He went on to be Commandant of the Royal Air Force College Cranwell in 1998 and Commander British Forces Cyprus and Administrator of the Sovereign Base Areas in 2000 before retiring in 2004.

References

1948 births
Alumni of the University of Edinburgh
Companions of the Order of the Bath
Living people
Officers of the Order of the British Empire
People educated at Morrison's Academy
People from Perth, Scotland
Recipients of the Commendation for Valuable Service in the Air
Royal Air Force air marshals
Commandants of the Royal Air Force College Cranwell